Eva Sonidsson (born 1955) is a Swedish social democratic politician. She has been a member of the Riksdag from 2006 to 2018.

External links
Eva Sonidsson at the Riksdag website

Living people
1955 births
Women members of the Riksdag
21st-century Swedish women politicians
Members of the Riksdag from the Social Democrats
Members of the Riksdag 2006–2010
Members of the Riksdag 2010–2014
Members of the Riksdag 2014–2018